Charles Harold Williams (23 June 1887 – 15 December 1971) was a British track and field athlete who competed in the 1908 Summer Olympics. He was born in Wolverhampton and died in Malvern, Worcestershire. In 1908 he finished eleventh in the long jump event.

References

External links
Sports Reference profile

1887 births
1971 deaths
Sportspeople from Wolverhampton
English male long jumpers
Olympic athletes of Great Britain
Athletes (track and field) at the 1908 Summer Olympics